Berma-ye Zarem Rud (also Romanized as Bermā-ye Zārem Rūd; also known as Bermā) is a village in Zarem Rud Rural District, Hezarjarib District, Neka County, Mazandaran Province, Iran.

It is located in the Alborz (Elburz) mountain range.

At the 2006 census, its population was 189, in 56 families.

References 

Populated places in Neka County
Settled areas of Elburz